Dianemobius is a genus of cricket in the tribe Pteronemobiini; species can be found in eastern Asia.

Taxonomy
The Orthoptera Species File database lists the following species:
Dianemobius chibae (Shiraki, 1911)
Dianemobius chinensis Gorochov, 1984
Dianemobius csikii (Bolívar, 1901)
Dianemobius fascipes (Walker, 1869)type species (as Eneoptera fascipes Walker = D. fascipes subsp. fascipes)
Dianemobius furumagiensis (Ohmachi & Furukawa, 1929)
Dianemobius jucundus Liu & Yang, 1998
Dianemobius kimurae (Shiraki, 1911)
Dianemobius protransversus Liu & Yang, 1998
Dianemobius timphus Ingrisch, 2001
Dianemobius wulaius Liu & Yang, 1998
Dianemobius zhengi Chen, 1994

References

External links

Ground crickets